David Petrus (born 1 August 1987) is a Czech football player who plays for FC Baník Ostrava.

References

External links
 
 Player's profile at iDNES.cz (Czech)

1987 births
Living people
Czech footballers
Association football forwards
FC Baník Ostrava players
Czech First League players